Max Padlow (August 15, 1912 – August 8, 1971) was a professional American football end for the Philadelphia Eagles (1935–1936) in the National Football League and the Cleveland Rams (1936) and the Cincinnati Bengals (1937) of the second American Football League. He played college football for Ohio State University.

References

1912 births
1971 deaths
American people of Russian-Jewish descent
Jewish American sportspeople
American football wide receivers
American football defensive ends
Ohio State Buckeyes football players
Philadelphia Eagles players
Cleveland Rams players
Cincinnati Bengals players
American Football League players
20th-century American Jews